Articulation may refer to:

Linguistics 
 Articulatory phonetics, the study of how humans produce speech sounds via the interaction of physiological structures
 Manner of articulation, how speech organs involved in making a sound make contact
 Place of articulation, positions of speech organs to create distinctive speech sounds
 Articulatory gestures, the actions necessary to enunciate language
 Articulatory phonology, a theory that attempts to unify phonetics and phonology
 Articulatory speech recognition, the recovery of speech from acoustic signals
 Articulatory synthesis, computational techniques for synthesizing speech based on models of human articulation processes
 Topic–focus articulation, a field of study concerned with marking old and new information in a clause

Engineering 
 Articulated vehicle, which have a pivoted joint allowing them to turn more sharply
 Articulation score, in telecommunications, a subjective measure of the intelligibility of a voice system
 Axle articulation, a vehicle's ability to flex its suspension, measured by ramp travel index

Other uses 
 Articulation (anatomy), the location at which two or more bones make contact
 Articulation (architecture), in art and architecture, is a method of styling the joints in the formal elements of architectural design
 Articulation (botany), a joint between two separable parts, as a leaf and a stem; see Glossary of botanical terms
 Articulation (dentistry), the contact relationship of the occlusal surfaces of the upper and lower teeth when moving into and away from centric occlusion
 Articulation (education), the process of comparing the content of courses that are transferred between K - 12 as well as postsecondary institutions
 Articulation (music), the transition or continuity between multiple notes or sounds
 Articulation (sociology), the process by which particular classes appropriate cultural forms and practices for their own use
 Articulation point, in graph theory, shared vertices of a biconnected component
 Articulatory suppression, a process of inhibiting memory by requiring an individual to repeat an irrelevant speech sound
 Articulatory technique, a type of Osteopathic Manipulative Treatment

See also 
 Articulate (disambiguation)
 Bendable (disambiguation)